Samuel Marshall (1757 - April 1, 1813) was a merchant, shipbuilder and political figure in Nova Scotia. He represented Yarmouth Township in the Nova Scotia House of Assembly from 1811 to 1813.

Marshall came to Nova Scotia from New York state in 1787, settling in Yarmouth. In 1794, he was named a justice of the peace. Around 1810, he was considered to be the leading shipbuilder and merchant in Yarmouth. Marshall died in office at Yarmouth.

His daughter Catherine married Samuel Campbell.

References 
 A Directory of the Members of the Legislative Assembly of Nova Scotia, 1758-1958, Public Archives of Nova Scotia (1958)

1813 deaths
Nova Scotia pre-Confederation MLAs
1757 births
People from Yarmouth, Nova Scotia